Field Station: Dinosaurs is an outdoor prehistoric theme park with two locations in the United States. The park is designed for families with children between the ages of three and eleven. The parks both feature a walking tour with full-size, scientifically accurate animatronic dinosaurs along with interactive exhibits and live shows designed to educate children about dinosaurs within the context of the local ecosystem. The Executive Producer and Expedition Commander is Guy Gsell, a lifelong dinosaur enthusiast.

The first location opened in New Jersey in 2012, when it was named Best Local Theme Park by Time Out New York  In 2013 Field Station: Dinosaurs was named the second best dinosaur theme park in the world. Fodor's named Field Station: Dinosaurs one of the World's Best Spots for Dinosaur Lovers on March 6, 2014.

In 2018, the second location opened in Derby, Kansas (Wichita metro area).

New Jersey park
The first location opened on May 26, 2012, at Snake Hill in Secaucus, New Jersey. After four seasons, Field Station: Dinosaurs lost its lease on the property to make room for a new campus of the Hudson County Schools of Technology. The Secaucus park closed on September 7, 2015 with record crowds and began its search of a new home.  Possible locations included Derby, Kansas and West Milford, New Jersey. In 2016, Field Station: Dinosaurs opened in its new location in Bergen County’s Overpeck County Park alongside Teaneck Creek. The lush greenery and natural environment provides a dramatic backdrop for the dinosaurs.

In 2018, a new dinosaur was introduced into the New Jersey park. The Spinosaurus won the popular vote from park goers and was brought in to replace the Argentinosaurus which met a fiery demise the previous season. When first purchased by Field Station: Dinosaurs, the 90’ Argentinosaurus was the largest animatronic dinosaur ever made.

The New Jersey exhibitions are:

Base Camp 
Base Camp serves as the entry point for all visitors to the park. Visitors receive their "credentials," a passport which is stamped as they visit and participate in the various games, workshops and shows throughout the park. Base Camp is also home to the TriceraShops gift shop, first aid and Expedition Central Command.

Amphitheater 
The Amphitheater is an open-air performance space. It features several shows that are performed throughout the day featuring the 15-foot dinosaur puppet:

 "Feeding Frenzy" uses the scientific method to solve the mystery of what the dinosaurs ate.
 "Found in New Jersey" is a fossil show that explores the history of dinosaurs in the Garden State.

Additional shows presented in the amphitheater include Field Station Challenge, Morning Briefing, Songs o' the Dinosaur Troubadour and the Dinosaur Dance Party.

Dig Site 
The Quarry features a dig site where children dig for fossils and the Paleontologists' Laboratory.

Riverview 
At the Riverview, visitors can see the 90-foot Argentinosaurus. They are also introduced to Hadrosaurus, New Jersey's official state dinosaur.

Family Tent 
The Plateau is the site of "Mesozoic Concentration" and "Raptor Feud" - family games in which contestants answer questions about dinosaurs, geology and paleontology, along with Dinos-Origami and "What Color is Your Dinosaurs?", a fun show for pre-readers.

Kansas park

Field Station: Dinosaurs opened up its second location in Derby, Kansas on May 26, 2018. This location features 44 animatronic dinosaurs and more than 40 live shows at several locations in the park throughout the day.  A large amphitheatre is the location of the popular 'T-Rex Feeding Frenzy' show that features the 14 foot long T-Rex puppet.

Attractions
The parks are marketed to families with younger children (11 and under).

Education
The educational programming at Field Station: Dinosaurs serves a regional audience of students, summer camp groups, and daycare centers.

List of dinosaurs
The following dinosaurs are featured in the parks.

 Ankylosaurus
 Apatosaurus
 Appalachiosaurus
 Argentinosaurus
 Baryonyx
 Brachiosaurus
 Claosaurus
 Compsognathus
 Daspletosaurus
 Deinosauchus
 Dilophosaurus
 Dimetrodon
 Dracorex Hogwartsia
 Dryptosaurus
 Edmontosaurus
 Hadrosaurus
 Hypsibema Missourie
 Niobrarasaurus Coleii
 Nyctosaurus
 Oryctodromeus
 Pachycephalosaurus
 Parasaurolophus
 Pteranodon
 Quetzalcoatlus
 Saurophaganax
 Spinosaurus
 Stegosaurus
 T-Rex
 Triceratops
 Tylosaurus
 Utahraptor
 Velociraptor

References

Amusement parks in New Jersey
2012 establishments in New Jersey
Animatronic attractions
Museums in Hudson County, New Jersey
Leonia, New Jersey
Dinosaur museums in the United States
Open-air museums in New Jersey